Braian Jose Samudio Segovia (born 23 December 1995) is a Paraguayan professional footballer who plays for Cerro Porteño and the Paraguay national football team.

Career

Guarani
Unveiled as a new signing for Brazilian Serie B competitors Guarani in 2017, Samudio settled well into the club, expressing that it was a very important achievement of him to be part of Guarani. Enjoying the impassionedness of his teams' supporters, the Paraguayan managed 7 goals in 26 league outings for the Bugre in 2017, which eventually earned him a move to Turkey.

Çaykur Rizespor (loan)
Passing the health test, Samudio officially transferred to Turkish side Çaykur Rizespor in 2017 on a loan deal, making an impact on the league and scoring 6 goals in his first 10 games, his first in a 3–1 victory over Adana Demirspor.

Cerro Porteño
In June 2022 Samudio signed to Cerro Porteño.

Career statistics

Club

Assist Goals

References

External links

Living people
1995 births
Paraguayan footballers
Association football forwards
União Agrícola Barbarense Futebol Clube players
Boa Esporte Clube players
Guarani FC players
Çaykur Rizespor footballers
Campeonato Brasileiro Série B players
Campeonato Brasileiro Série C players
Süper Lig players
TFF First League players
Paraguayan expatriate footballers
Expatriate footballers in Brazil
Expatriate footballers in Turkey
Paraguayan expatriate sportspeople in Brazil
Paraguayan expatriate sportspeople in Turkey
Paraguay international footballers
Sportspeople from Ciudad del Este